A Beginner's Guide to the Sea is the second album from Melbourne-based band The Holy Sea.

The album was recorded at Atlantis Sound in Port Melbourne by David McCluney and was released in 2008.

The album featured the singles Paddy, There's Got to Be One More Bar Open and Ghost Town.

The album artwork was designed by Perth-based comic artist Edward J. Grug III.

Track listing

Musicians
Henry F. Skerritt – Vocals, Guitar, Harmonica
Daniel Hoey – Piano, Rhodes, Organ, Harmonium
Victor Utting – Guitar, Percussion
F. David Bower – Drums, Percussion
Andrew Fuller – Bass
Emma Frichot – Backing Vocals
Gareth Skinner – Cello
Garrett Costigan – Pedal Steel

External links
MessandNoise.com review
Rave Magazine review

References

The Holy Sea albums
2008 albums